Lisbeth Hernández Lecona (born 10 April 1974) is a Mexican politician affiliated with the PRI. She currently serves as Senator of the LXII Legislature of the Mexican Congress representing Morelos.

References

1974 births
Living people
Politicians from Mexico City
Women members of the Senate of the Republic (Mexico)
Members of the Senate of the Republic (Mexico)
Institutional Revolutionary Party politicians
21st-century Mexican politicians
21st-century Mexican women politicians
Members of the Constituent Assembly of Mexico City
Universidad Autónoma del Estado de Morelos alumni
Members of the Congress of Morelos
Senators of the LXII and LXIII Legislatures of Mexico